Wheatland is a city in Hickory County, Missouri, United States. The population was 277 at the 2020 census.

History
Wheatland was platted in 1869. The village most likely was named after the retirement home of the fifteenth President of the United States, James Buchanan, who died June 1, 1868, at his home, called Wheatland, in Lancaster, Pennsylvania.

Geography
Wheatland is located at  (37.943450, -93.403097).

Demographics

2010 census
At the 2010 census there were 371 people in 185 households, including 95 families, in the city. The racial makup of the city was 94.1% White, 1.6% African American, 0.5% Native American, 1.9% Pacific Islander, 0.3% from other races, and 1.6% from two or more races. Hispanic or Latino of any race were 1.6%.

Of the 185 households 23.2% had children under the age of 18 living with them, 30.8% were married couples living together, 14.1% had a female householder with no husband present, 6.5% had a male householder with no wife present, and 48.6% were non-families. 43.8% of households were one person and 23.8% were one person aged 65 or older. The average household size was 2.01 and the average family size was 2.67.

The median age was 44.4 years. 19.4% of residents were under the age of 18; 8.8% were between the ages of 18 and 24; 22.9% were from 25 to 44; 27.7% were from 45 to 64; and 21.3% were 65 or older. The gender makeup of the city was 46.9% male and 53.1% female.

2000 census
At the 2000 census there were 388 people in 192 households, including 105 families, in the city. The population density was 1,093.8 people per square mile (428.0/km). There were 226 housing units at an average density of 637.1 per square mile (249.3/km).  The racial makup of the city was 98.97% White, 0.52% Native American, 0.26% Asian, and 0.26% from two or more races. Hispanic or Latino of any race were 0.26%.

Of the 192 households 22.9% had children under the age of 18 living with them, 37.0% were married couples living together, 13.5% had a female householder with no husband present, and 44.8% were non-families. 42.2% of households were one person and 30.7% were one person aged 65 or older. The average household size was 2.02 and the average family size was 2.75.

The age distribution was 22.9% under the age of 18, 7.7% from 18 to 24, 19.1% from 25 to 44, 23.5% from 45 to 64, and 26.8% 65 or older. The median age was 46 years. For every 100 females, there were 79.6 males. For every 100 females age 18 and over, there were 65.2 males.

The median household income was $17,500 and the median family income  was $27,596. Males had a median income of $23,393 versus $14,375 for females. The per capita income for the city was $10,025. About 20.0% of families and 28.1% of the population were below the poverty line, including 34.5% of those under age 18 and 29.8% of those age 65 or over.

Education
Wheatland is served by Wheatland R-II School District and Wheatland High School

Sports
Lucas Oil Speedway is a motorsports complex that features a dirt oval, an off-road track and a motorboat racing lake.

Notable person
 Mike Parson, Governor of Missouri, former Lieutenant Governor, born in Wheatland

References

Cities in Hickory County, Missouri
Cities in Missouri